The Vanuatu Football Federation (VFF) is the governing body of football in Vanuatu. It is an association of Vanuatu football clubs, and it organises national competitions and international matches for the Vanuatu National Football Team.

The VFF was founded in 1934. It has been affiliated with FIFA since 1988 and is also a member of the Oceania Football Confederation (OFC).

Staff

References 

 "Women's football on the rise in Vanuatu | Vanuatu Daily Post". Dailypost.vu. 2013-11-27. Retrieved 2013-12-08.
 "http://www.yumitoktokstret.com/iau-tuan-emi-vaes-presiden-blong-vff/". Yumitoktokstret.com. 2015-12-08. Posted by The Penguin.

External links
 Vanuatu at the FIFA website.
 Vanuatu at OFC site
 Vanuatu Football Federation site

Vanuatu
Football in Vanuatu
Sports organizations established in 1934